Tshepang Makhethe (born 19 February 1996) is a South African hammer thrower.

Makhethe finished tenth at the 2014 World Junior Championships. He won the silver medal at the 2015 African Junior Championships followed by the bronze medal at the 2016 African Championships. He finished eighth at the 2017 Universiade, ninth at the 2018 Commonwealth Games and fourth at the 2018 African Championships.

He won his first national title at the 2019 South African Championships, ending Chris Harmse's reign of 23 consecutive victories.

His personal best throw is 71.28 metres, achieved in March 2017 in Sasolburg.

Achievements

National titles
 South African Championships
 Hammer throw: 2019

  Championships
 Hammer throw: 2019

References

External links
 

1994 births
Living people
South African male hammer throwers
Athletes (track and field) at the 2018 Commonwealth Games
Commonwealth Games competitors for South Africa
Competitors at the 2017 Summer Universiade
Competitors at the 2019 Summer Universiade
South African Athletics Championships winners
People from Sasolburg
20th-century South African people
21st-century South African people